The United States Miscellaneous Caribbean Islands is an obsolete collective term for the territories currently or formerly controlled by the United States in the Caribbean Sea. Most of the islands were acquired through claims made via the Guano Islands Act:

 Bajo Nuevo Bank (controlled by Colombia, claimed by the U.S., Jamaica, and Nicaragua)
 Corn Islands (returned to Nicaragua on April 25, 1971)
 Navassa Island (U.S. unincorporated territory, claimed by Haiti)
 Quita Sueño Bank (claim abandoned on September 17, 1981, administered by Colombia)
 Roncador Bank (ceded to Colombia on September 17, 1981)
 Serrana Bank (ceded to Colombia on September 17, 1981)
 Serranilla Bank (controlled by Colombia, claimed by the U.S., Honduras, Nicaragua and, until 1994, Jamaica)
 Swan Islands (ceded to Honduras on September 1, 1972)

The islands were given the FIPS country code of  before 1974. With the transfer of sovereignty of most of the islands, the FIPS country code of  now represents only Navassa Island, still administered by the United States.

See also 
 United States Minor Outlying Islands
 United States Miscellaneous Pacific Islands

External links 
 Changes in FIPS PUB 10
 Return dates

Caribbean islands of the United States
 
United States Minor Outlying Islands